Claussen's Bakery, also known as Claussen's Inn, is a historic commercial bakery located at Columbia, South Carolina. It was built in 1928, and is a two-story, trapezoidal plan, brick building that contains a total of 25,000 square feet. The Columbia bakery ceased operating in 1963. It was later converted to a boutique hotel.

It was added to the National Register of Historic Places in 1987.

References

External links
The Inn At Claussen's website

Hotels in South Carolina
Industrial buildings and structures on the National Register of Historic Places in South Carolina
Industrial buildings completed in 1928
Buildings and structures in Columbia, South Carolina
National Register of Historic Places in Columbia, South Carolina
1928 establishments in South Carolina